This is a list of Ceylonese organizations with a royal prefix.

Civilian

Military

See also
 List of Canadian organizations with royal prefix

References

Monarchy in Ceylon
Royal patronage